Saint Gibrian (or Gybrian, Gobrian; died 509) was an Irish saint associated with Reims and the Marne region.

Life
Gibrian's story appears in the fourth book of the Historia Remensis ecclesiae ("History of the church of Reims"), which was written by Flodoard in the tenth century. Gibrian is mentioned as one of a group of siblings from Ireland who were received by St Remigius at Reims, the seat of his diocese, and given permission to settle in the Marne region. They are said to number seven brothers, Gibrian, Helan, Tressan, German, Veran, Abran and Petran, and three sisters, Francla, Portia and Promptia. Gibrian chose for himself a spot near Chalôns-sur-Marne, apparently in what is now the commune of Saint-Gibrien, which derives its name from the saint. 

Gibrian died in 509 and a small chapel was built to mark his grave. Flodoard further writes that Normans destroyed the chapel in the ninth century, but that the body was left intact and following a series of miracles at his tomb, his relics were translated to an altar at Reims.
Other versions of this account were later told in Gibrian's and Tressan's Lives, which James Kenney regards as "late and fabulous compositions".

Cult

While the matter of Gibrian's sanctity was not in danger, it was not until the mid-12th century that he began to attract a cult at Reims. This was due to the work of Odo, the abbot of Saint-Remi, who sought to support the new monastery of Chartreux in Champagne. In 1145, Odo had the saint's relics moved to a new shrine at the new monastery. As many as 102 miracles were recorded between April 16 (the day when the relics were translated) and August 24, mostly on Sundays and feast-days.

There is no sign of a popular cult for a long while afterwards, but it enjoyed a revival in 1325, when the saint's reliquary was replaced with a more magnificent one, the place becoming a destination of renewed interest for pilgrims.

Monks of Ramsgate account

The monks of St Augustine's Abbey, Ramsgate wrote in their Book of Saints (1921),

Butler's account

The hagiographer Alban Butler (1710–1773) wrote in his Lives of the Fathers, Martyrs, and Other Principal Saints under May 8,

Notes

Citations

Sources

 
 
 
 
 

Medieval Irish saints on the Continent